Nkhensani Kate Bilankulu (born 14 February 1966) is a South African politician from Limpopo. She has been a member of parliament (MP) in the National Assembly of South Africa since May 2019. She is a member of the African National Congress.

Parliamentary career
Bilankulu was placed number 1 on the regional Limpopo list of the African National Congress for the 8 May 2019 national and provincial elections. After the elections, she was allocated a seat in the National Assembly. She was sworn into the 6th Parliament on 22 May.

On 29 June 2019, she was appointed to Portfolio Committee on Social Development. On 12 July 2019, she was elected chairperson of the Committee on Multi-Party Women's Caucus.

She is also the deputy chair of the ANC Women's League.

References

External links

Ms Nkhensani Kate Bilankulu at Parliament of South Africa

1966 births
Place of birth missing (living people)
People from Limpopo
African National Congress politicians
Members of the National Assembly of South Africa
21st-century South African politicians
Living people